Farakka Super Thermal Power Plant is located at Nabarun in Murshidabad district in Indian state of West Bengal. The power plant is one of the coal based power plants of NTPC.

Geography

Location

Note: The map alongside presents some of the notable locations in a part of the subdivision. All places marked in the map are linked in the larger full screen map.

Capacity
The unit wise capacity and other details are as follows.

Coal link
A major coal mining project of Eastern Coalfields Limited (Rajmahal open cast project, a part of Rajmahal coalfield) is going on in Boarijore, Mahagama and Sunderpahari CD Blocks of Godda district in Jharkhand. Rajmahal open cast project (earlier known as Lalmatia Colliery) supplies coal to the Farakka Super Thermal Power Station and the 2,340 MW Kahalgaon Super Thermal Power Station. Coal import from Indonesia for Farakka Super Thermal Power Plant by Farakka Port and National Waterway 1 .Jindal ITF Limited coal carry by barge from Haldia Port  to Farakka.

See also

 List of power stations in West Bengal

References

External links
Specifications on NTPC website

Coal-fired power stations in West Bengal
Buildings and structures in Murshidabad district
1986 establishments in West Bengal
Energy infrastructure completed in 1986
20th-century architecture in India